Radical 194 or radical ghost meaning "ghost" or "demon" is one of the 8 Kangxi radicals (214 radicals in total) composed of 10 strokes.

 (9 strokes in Simplified Chinese) is also the 184th indexing component in the Table of Indexing Chinese Character Components predominantly adopted by Simplified Chinese dictionaries published in mainland China.

Evolution

The character is historically composed of  "legs",  representing a large demon's head and a curl looking similar to  taken to represent a swirl of vapour, or a demon's tail.

The character can be traced to the oracle bone script, where it depicts a man kneeling on a monster head.

Derived characters

Most of the characters derived from the radical have meanings related to ghosts or souls, including   "devil, demon",  "black magic",  "nightmare",  "soul".

Variant forms

Literature 

Li, Leyi: “Tracing the Roots of Chinese Characters: 500 Cases”. Beijing 1993, 
Harbaugh, Rick, Chinese Characters: A Genealogy and Dictionary, Yale University Press (1998), .
Childs-Johnson, Elizabeth (江伊莉), 甲骨文的“鬼”与假面具 (The Gui-Spirit in Oracle Bone Inscriptions), International Conference Celebrating the 95th Anniversary of the Discovery of Oracle Bone Inscriptions", Anyang, China, 1994.

See also
Ghosts in Chinese culture
Oni

External links

Unihan Database - U+9B3C

194
184